The men's team time trial was a road bicycle racing event held as part of the cycling at the 1912 Summer Olympics programme. It was the first appearance of the event. The competition was held on Sunday July 7, 1912.

Each nation that sent at least four cyclists to the individual time trial was also considered to have competed as a team. The times of the top four cyclists for each nation were summed to give a total team time, with the best total times winning. Great Britain had three teams, as the English, Irish, and Scottish cyclists were considered separate.

Belgium, Canada, and South Africa did not send enough cyclists to make a team.

Three teams did not have enough cyclists finish to earn a valid team score. Only three of Bohemia's five cyclists finished, as did three of Norway's six. Only one of Russia's ten cyclists finished.

Medalists

Results

References

 
 

Cycling at the 1912 Summer Olympics
Road cycling at the 1912 Summer Olympics